José Alonso y Trelles (1857–1924) was a Uruguayan poet who wrote under the pseudonym El Viejo Pancho.

Literary works
John the madman (poem of two cantos. Foreword Orosmán Moratorium. Montevideo, 1867 )
Guacha! (National drama in one act. Printing and publishing house "Renaissance" by Luis and Manuel Perez. Charter-prologue Monegal Casiano . Montevideo, 1913 )
Paja brava (1st ed. Verses Creoles. Printing and publishing house "Renaissance" of Luis and Manuel Perez. Montevideo, 1915 )
Paja brava (2nd ed. Verses Creoles. Augmented Edition. Printing and publishing house "Renaissance" of Luis and Manuel Perez. Montevideo, 1920 )
Paja brava (3rd ed. Verses Creoles. Augmented Edition. A. Barreiro National Library and Ramos. Barreiro and Co.. Successors. Montevideo, 1923 )
Paja brava (4th ed. Verses Creoles. Augmented Edition. Foreword by Justino Zavala Muniz . general Agency Bookseller & Publications. Montevideo - Buenos Aires, 1926 )
Paja Brava El Viejo Pancho and outras works of Joseph A. and Trelles (in Galician, Ed Oriberthor, SL 1998 )

References

1857 births
1924 deaths
20th-century Uruguayan poets
Uruguayan male poets
Uruguayan people of Asturian descent
Spanish emigrants to Uruguay
People from A Mariña Oriental
19th-century Uruguayan poets
19th-century male writers
20th-century Uruguayan male writers